Bionic Commando is a video game franchise consisting of an original arcade video game released in 1987 and several later versions and sequels.

Background
The original Japanese arcade game and its Famicom counterpart (Hitler's Resurrection) are called .

They were "wire action" games created by Tokuro Fujiwara, based on his earlier 1983 arcade game Roc'n Rope. He originally intended Bionic Commando to be an expanded version of its predecessor Roc'n Rope.

Plot
In all versions of the game, the protagonist is Nathan "Rad" Spencer. The text below summarizes the plot of Hitler no Fukkatsu on Japanese FC release. Due to anti-Nazi censorship in the West, the international version Bionic Commando omitted all Nazi references like swastikas, and changed the name "Hitler" to "Master D" and "Weitzmann" to "Killt"; the main storyline is otherwise unchanged.

The game is set in an alternate timeline, in which Nazism is not completely eradicated following the defeat of the Third Reich in WWII. Nazi ideology was carried on by a nation called "the Imperial state".

The story begins with a solo narrative: somewhere in the 1980s, a top-secret WWII-era Nazi document called "Plan Albatross" was discovered by the Imperialists. Generalissimo Weitzmann, leader of the Imperial army, decided to realize the plan himself. Another superpower, "the Republic" (ostensibly modeled after the real-life United States), then at war with the Imperial State, sent a commando named Super Joe to retrieve the plan and to stop Weitzmann. However, Joe lost contact with Republican HQ not long after he entered Imperialist territories.

In response, the republicans dispatched another agent, Rad Spencer the Bionic Commando, to rescue Super Joe. Rad singlehandedly infiltrated the Imperialist-controlled areas. Soon he found Joe was indeed captured as a POW.

As Joe was freed, he told Rad his discoveries: the "Albatross" was a wonderweapon that the Nazis did not manage to finish in WWII, and the Imperialists were trying to restore it. However, he was captured before he could learn more. Rad promised him to carry on to sabotage the weapon and the plan for good.

Eventually, Rad reached the heart of the Imperialist's secret base. He came just in time to witness the Albatross plan at its final stage: In order to command the "albatross", an almost-invincible flying gunship, Adolf Hitler must be revived as well. Weitzmann also had his own plan: he wanted to terminate Hitler's revival process and keep the ship to himself. Weitzmann's plan backfired as he got killed by an "awakened" Hitler, who vowed to conquer the world with "Albatross".

In the ensuing battle, Rad destroyed the airborne Albatross by shooting at its reactors. Hitler managed to jettison to safety, and attempted to escape the base in a helicopter. Rad took his only chance by firing a bazooka shot mid-air at the helicopter's cockpit, blowing Hitler and his plane apart. Hitler's second death also triggered the base's self-destruction sequence. Rad narrowly escaped, and reunited with Super Joe and his other comrade-in-arms.

In the ending scene, it was revealed that the narrator at the beginning was Super Joe, who was still alive as of 2010. He hoped the legend of Bionic Commando would be passed on to future generations with his stories.

Gameplay
The Bionic Commando games are platform games in which the player cannot jump. A bionic arm is used to cross gaps and climb ledges. The grappling gun/hook feature appeared earlier in Konami's Roc'n Rope and then in subsequent games such as Earthworm Jim and Tomb Raider.

Development
The music for the original arcade game was developed by Harumi Fujita, a member of the then all-female Capcom Sound Team. Fellow female video game composer Junko Tamiya adapted two of the original arcade tracks (The "Bionic Commando Theme" and "The Powerplant") and expanded the soundtrack by adding several new songs in the console versions for the Japanese Famicom and the NES ports of the game.

Versions
The original arcade game was advertised in the United States as a sequel to Commando, going as far to refer to the game's main character as Super Joe (the protagonist of Commando) in the promotional brochure, who was originally an unnamed member of a "special commando unit" in the Japanese and World versions. In 1988, Capcom produced a home version for the Nintendo Entertainment System, also titled Bionic Commando, that was drastically different from the original arcade game.

A version much truer to the coin-op original was released for the Amiga (OCS) in 1988; it was also ported to the other leading micros: the Atari ST, Commodore 64, Amstrad CPC and ZX Spectrum.

An adaptation of Bionic Commando for the Game Boy was released in 1992. There was also an MSdos/386 version of the game available circa 1991.

Legacy
A sequel, Bionic Commando: Elite Forces, was released in 1999 for the Game Boy Color. Though it borrows some elements from its predecessors, Elite Forces has a different plot from the rest of the series. Also, the characters (an unnamed male or female commando) have a few more moves, such as the ability to climb down from platforms, and can also utilize a sniper rifle in some segments to eliminate distant enemies.

An enhanced remake of the 1988 NES version was developed by Grin and published by Capcom for Microsoft Windows, PlayStation Network, and Xbox Live Arcade and was released on August 13, 2008, under the name, Bionic Commando Rearmed (バイオニック コマンドー マスターD復活計画, Bionic Commando: Master D Resurrection Project in Japan). The remake serves as a prelude to the 2009 video game Bionic Commando. A sequel, Bionic Commando Rearmed 2, was released in February 2011.

In November 2015, Capcom released the 5 Disc Senjo no Okami & Top Secret Original Sound Collection (戦場の狼＆トップシークレットオリジナルサウンドコレクション) It included the soundtrack from all in-house developed games from those two series. Manami Matsumae wrote the liner notes.

References

 
Capcom franchises
Video game franchises
Video game franchises introduced in 1987
Amiga games
Amstrad CPC games
Commodore 64 games
ZX Spectrum games
Atari ST games